Yitzhak HaLevi Herzog (3 December 1888 – 25 July 1959), also known as Isaac Herzog or Hertzog, was the first Chief Rabbi of Ireland, his term lasted from 1921 to 1936. From 1936 until his death in 1959, he was Ashkenazi Chief Rabbi of the British Mandate of Palestine and of Israel after its independence in 1948. He was the father of Chaim Herzog and grandfather of Isaac Herzog, both presidents of Israel.

Biography
Isaac Halevi Herzog was born at Łomża in Russian Poland, the son of Liba Miriam (Cyrowicz) and Joel Leib Herzog. He moved to the United Kingdom with his family in 1898, where they settled in Leeds. His initial schooling was largely at the instruction of his father who was a rabbi in Leeds and then later in Paris.

After mastering Talmudic studies at a young age, Yitzhak went on to attend the Sorbonne and then later the University of London, where he received his doctorate. His thesis, which made him famous in the Jewish world, concerned his claim of re-discovering Tekhelet, the type of blue dye once used for the making of Tzitzit.

Rabbi Herzog's descendants have continued to be active in Israel's political life. His son Chaim Herzog  was a general in the Israel Defense Forces and later became ambassador of Israel to the UN and sixth President of Israel. His son Yaakov Herzog served as Israel's ambassador to Canada and later as Director General of the Prime Minister's Office. He also accepted an offer to become Chief Rabbi of the British Commonwealth but due to ill health never took up that role.

His grandson Isaac Herzog is the President of Israel. He also previously served as a member of the Knesset, Israel's parliament, and head of the opposition. He  previously served as housing and tourism minister and minister of welfare and later was chairman of the Jewish Agency.

Rabbinic career
Rabbi Herzog served as rabbi of Belfast from 1916 to 1919 and was appointed rabbi of Dublin in 1919. A fluent speaker of the Irish language, he supported the First Dáil and the Irish republican cause during the Irish War of Independence, and became known as "the Sinn Féin Rabbi". He went on to serve as Chief Rabbi of Ireland between 1922 and 1936, when he immigrated to Palestine to succeed Rabbi Abraham Isaac Kook as Ashkenazi Chief Rabbi upon his death. He became a supporter of both the Irish Republican Army and the Irgun.

In May 1939, shortly before the Second World War, the British put out the White Paper of 1939 restricting Jewish immigration to Palestine. After leading a procession through the streets of Jerusalem, with an unusually united Jewish following from all sects, on the steps of the Hurva Synagogue he turned and said: "We cannot agree to the White Paper. Just as the prophets did before me, I hereby rip it in two." Some 40 years later, on 10 November 1975 Ambassador Herzog repeated his father's gesture with the UN resolution that Zionism is equal to racism.

During the Second World War, Rabbi Herzog travelled with great risk to the US, and back, not before he was able to secure a meeting with Roosevelt. Roosevelt smiled and did not reply to the Rabbi's pleadings for a promise to help the Jews of Europe. His biographer records that several people noticed that his hair turned white when he left the meeting, which he perceived as a failure. Following this, he immediately returned home, missing the ride on a ship that was sunk by a U-boat, and taking what was said to be the last civilian ship to cross the Atlantic during the war.

After the war, Rabbi Herzog dedicated himself to saving Jewish children especially babies and bringing them back from their places of hiding throughout all of Europe, to their families or to Jewish orphanages. Many of these were hidden in Christian monasteries or by Christian families, who refused to return them. In his biography, he tells of the difficulties he had of meeting the Pope who avoided him, but did receive in the end assistance from the Vatican. In later years it was found that Karol Wojtyła, future Pope John Paul II, was the contact who helped the rabbi out. However, defenders of Pope Pius XII have asserted that Herzog maintained friendly relations with the pontiff both during and after World War II. In 1945, he stated: “The people of Israel will never forget what His Holiness and his illustrious delegates are doing for our unfortunate brothers and sisters in the most tragic hour of our history, which is living proof of Divine Providence in this world.”

Published works
Rabbi Herzog was recognised as a great rabbinical authority, and he wrote many books and articles dealing with halachic problems surrounding the Torah and the State of Israel. Indeed, his writings helped shaped the attitude of the Religious Zionist Movement toward the State of Israel. Rabbi Herzog authored:
Main Institutions of Jewish Law
Heichal Yitzchak
Techukah leYisrael al pi haTorah
Pesachim uKetavim
The Royal Purple and the Biblical Blue

Awards and recognition
 In 1958, Rabbi Herzog was awarded the Israel Prize, in Rabbinical literature.

See also
History of the Jews in Ireland
History of the Jews in Northern Ireland
Herzog (disambiguation)
Shmuel Wosner
List of Israel Prize recipients

References

External links

1888 births
1959 deaths
People from Łomża
People from Łomża Governorate
Levites
20th-century British rabbis
Chief rabbis of Ireland
Emigrants from the Russian Empire to the United Kingdom
British Ashkenazi Jews
Irish Ashkenazi Jews
Irish nationalists
British emigrants to Mandatory Palestine
Ashkenazi Jews in Mandatory Palestine
Israeli people of Polish-Jewish descent
University of Paris alumni
Alumni of the University of London
Orthodox rabbis in Mandatory Palestine
Chief rabbis of Israel
Israel Prize Rabbi recipients
Israel Prize in Rabbinical literature recipients
Yitzhak HaLevi Herzog
Burials at Sanhedria Cemetery
Irish Zionists
Clergy from Belfast